Sunflower is a black comedy  ZEE5 original web series directed by Vikas Bahl. Rahul Sengupta is the co-director of the series. Produced by Reliance Entertainment, Starring actor-comedian Sunil Grover in the lead role  as Sonu. The cast includes actors like Ranvir Shorey, Girish Kulkarni, Shonali Nagrani, Sonal Jha and Ashish Vidyarthi.

The show consisted of 8 episodes, it started streaming on Zee5 on June 11, 2021, and received generally positive reviews from critics and audience. It was praised for its direction, writing and acting performances.

Plot 
The story revolves around a murder mystery based in a middle-class housing society in Mumbai called "Sunflower".

Cast 
 Sunil Grover as Sonu Singh
 Ranvir Shorey as Inspector S. Digendra
 Girish Kulkarni as Sub Inspector Chetan Tambe 
 Mukul Chadda as Mr. Ahuja
 Radha Bhatt as Mrs. Ahuja
 Ashish Vidyarthi as Dilip Iyer
 Ashwin Kaushal as Mr Raj Kapoor
 Ria Nalavade as Paddy Iyer
 Shonali Nagrani as Naina Kapoor
 Sonal Jha as Mrs Iyer
 Nirvair Bhan as Monty
Sameer Khakhar as abusive heart-patient
 Sal Yusuf as Chairman of Sonu Singh's Company
 Saloni Khanna as Aanchal
 Annapurna Soni as Maid Kamini
 Dayana Erappa as Justina
 Pallavi Das as Juhi
 Ajay–Atul as judges of singing competition (guest appearance)
 Simran Nerurkar as Gurleen
 Aarav Chowdhary as Ramesh Kapoor
 Jaimin Panchal
 Shayank shukla as Aditya khanna

Episode list

Release 
The ZEE5 original web series premiered on 11 June 2021.

Critical Reception 
Archika Khurana from TOI says that Sunflower Season 1 is an engrossing thriller laced with dark humor. TOI rates the web series at 3 out of 5. The web series could have been a bigger success if it did not have a laid-back execution. Sunil Grover gets full marks as he plays the role of Sonu Singh to perfection.

From Vakaao, Aashna Varshney says that the web series is a great watch as Sunil Grover and major plotline both impresses you as the season progresses. Many different subplots make the web series a little disturbing as the focus seems to be losing from the main murder mystery plot. However, the main storyline and Sonu Singh's performance is worth the watch. She says it is worth the watch and a recommended entertainer.

Divy Tripathi from Film Companion says that this web series is a beautiful experience with spot-on direction and acting. Ranveer Shorey plays the character of a no-nonsense cop with perfection and teamed with Girish Kulkarni, the duo looks perfect as investigating officers.

References

External links 

Sunflower at ZEE5

Hindi-language television shows
Indian drama television series